Zdravko Karadachki (born June 21, 1993) is a Bulgarian footballer who plays for ES La Rochelle.

Playing career 
Karadachki began playing in 2010 with FC Septemvri Simitli in the Second Professional Football League. In 2013, he was loaned to OFC Pirin Blagoevgrad. In 2016, he played abroad in the Canadian Soccer League with Scarborough SC. After two seasons with Scarborough he played in the Scottish League Two with Edinburgh City F.C. In 2018, he was transferred to Alloa Athletic F.C. in the Scottish Championship.

At the conclusion of the season he departed from Alloa Athletic. Shortly after returned to Septemvri Simitli to play in the Bulgarian Third League. In 2020, he assisted Septemvri Simitli in securing promotion to the Second Professional Football League. He signed a contract with Vendée Fontenay Foot in 2021 to play in the Championnat National 3. Karadachki resumed playing in France by signing with ES La Rochelle in the western side of France in 2022.

Career statistics

Club

References 

1993 births
Living people
Bulgarian footballers
Association football defenders
FC Septemvri Simitli players
OFC Pirin Blagoevgrad players
Scarborough SC players
F.C. Edinburgh players
Alloa Athletic F.C. players
Vendée Fontenay Foot players
ES La Rochelle players
Canadian Soccer League (1998–present) players
Scottish Professional Football League players
Bulgarian expatriate footballers
Expatriate soccer players in Canada
Expatriate footballers in Scotland
Bulgarian expatriate sportspeople in Canada
Bulgarian expatriate sportspeople in Scotland
Second Professional Football League (Bulgaria) players
Championnat National 3 players
Sportspeople from Blagoevgrad